The 2003 State of Origin series was the 22nd year that the annual three-game series between Queensland and New South Wales was contested entirely under 'state of origin' selection rules. Queensland's return to a renovated Lang Park was soured when Andrew Johns returned to form for New South Wales in devastating fashion.

Arnold Schwarzenegger appeared in television promotions for the 2003 series. Blues coach Phil Gould sparked controversy before the series had even started when he slammed the form of his champion half-back Johns in his Sun-Herald column. Gould claimed that Johns had lost his "self-confidence" in an attack that caused outrage from all corners, including Johns himself, who had words with Gould at a pre-Origin briefing. But in the end it was psychology that worked, as 2003 was Johns' best ever series performance.



Game I

In Game I, Andrew Johns spoiled what was supposed to be a party time for the Queenslanders, who returned to their spiritual home of Suncorp Stadium formerly known as Lang Park. The ground was quickly nicknamed the "Sand Pit" as its sandy surface was constantly shifting under the feet of players. Both Maroons centres Justin Hodges and Paul Bowman, were taken from the field with serious knee injuries which were later blamed on the shifting surface.

The Blues pack led by interchange prop Luke Bailey, hammered their Maroons counterparts and gave Johns plenty of room to weave his magic. Johns contributed 13 points to the tally while Anthony Minichiello scored a try double.

Game II

The series was virtually decided by half-time of game II after the Blues raced to a 17–0 lead. Johns was again the catalyst starting the scoring with a brilliant banana kick that rebounded off the cross bar, went through the hands of Michael De Vere and fell to the ground before Ben Kennedy pounced.

There was no greater example of the brilliant halfback's influence than the last minute before the break. Johns kicked for touch from a 20-metre restart, then after winning the ensuing scrum, hoisted a bomb high into the air which was contested before being batted back into his hands. Without a second thought and while on the run, he potted a 25-metre field goal with ease.

The final score was 27–4 to the Blues who remained unbeaten from seven matches on their home turf of Telstra Stadium.

Game III

Game III, a "dead rubber", restored some much needed pride for the Maroons who dominated the Blues in every facet of the game. Winger Matt Sing was superb, scoring three tries in a man-of-the match performance.

Queensland started with a new-found zest and led 16-0 after just 17 minutes before strangling the Blues out of the contest. Johns was forced to accept the shield in front of an almost empty stadium after Queensland had completed a lap of honour. It was an anticlimactic end to what had been the gifted number seven's best ever series. Queensland's dead rubber win equalled their biggest ever State of Origin victory, which was first equalled in 1989, and then again in 2008, before it was broken in the third game of the 2015 series.

Teams
A total of twelve players from the 2003 Brisbane Broncos season were selected to play in the series, making them the most heavily represented club. A total of nine players from the 2003 Sydney Roosters season were selected to play in the series, making them the second most heavily represented club.

New South Wales

Queensland

See also
2003 NRL season

References

Footnotes
 Big League's 25 Years of Origin Collectors' Edition, News Magazines, Surry Hills, Sydney

External links
2003 State of Origin  at sportsphotography.net
State of Origin 2003 at rugbyleagueproject.org

State of Origin series
State of Origin series